Cesare Gabbia (born 6 May 1992) is an Italian male rower, bronze medal winner at senior level at the World Rowing Championships and European Rowing Championships.

References

External links
 

1992 births
Living people
Sportspeople from Genoa
Italian male rowers
Rowers of Marina Militare
World Rowing Championships medalists for Italy